Graeme Marais (born 15 July 1982) is a South African cricketer. He played in six first-class and seven List A matches for Boland from 2001 to 2003.

See also
 List of Boland representative cricketers

References

External links
 

1982 births
Living people
South African cricketers
Boland cricketers
Cricketers from Johannesburg